Chelsey Gullickson (born August 29, 1990) is an American former professional tennis player.

Her highest WTA singles ranking is 399, which she reached in June 2008. Her career-high in doubles is 665, which she reached in July 2008. She is the sister of professional tennis player Carly Gullickson and daughter of former major league baseball pitcher Bill Gullickson.

She won the 2010 NCAA Women's Tennis Championship in singles for the University of Georgia. Although not having a WTA rank at the time, she received two wild cards for the 2010 US Open, where she drew the top seed Caroline Wozniacki in the first singles round and lost, 1–6, 1–6. In doubles, she and her sister Carly won their first-round match against Sara Errani and Roberta Vinci, 6–2, 6–3, then lost to fourth seeds Květa Peschke and Katarina Srebotnik.

ITF finals

Singles (2–0)

Doubles (0–1)

External links
 
 

1990 births
Living people
American female tennis players
Georgia Lady Bulldogs tennis players
People from Palm Beach Gardens, Florida
Tennis people from Florida